Gianluca Bacchiocchi (born 6 April 1987, in Roma) is an Italian association football midfielder who currently plays for S.S. Cavese 1919.

Appearances on Italian Series 

Serie C2 : 47 Apps, 2 Goals

Serie D : 27 Apps

Total : 74 Apps, 2 Goals

External links
http://aic.football.it/scheda/19071/bacchiocchi-gianluca.htm

1987 births
Italian footballers
Living people
A.S. Melfi players
Association football midfielders
A.S.D. Barletta 1922 players
Cavese 1919 players